Chyornaya is a rural locality (a village) in Argunovskoye Rural Settlement, Nikolsky District, Vologda Oblast, Russia. The population was 14 as of 2002.

Geography 
The distance to Nikolsk is 54 km, to Argunovo is 12 km. Korepino is the nearest rural locality.

References 

Rural localities in Nikolsky District, Vologda Oblast